The New Zealand men's national under-20 football team, more commonly known as the Junior All Whites, is controlled by New Zealand Football and represents New Zealand in international Under 20 or youth football competitions. The 25,000 capacity North Harbour Stadium is used for home games of the Junior All Whites.

Competition record

OFC
The OFC Under 20 Qualifying Tournament is a tournament held once every two years to decide the two qualification spots for the Oceania Football Confederation (OFC) and its representatives at the FIFA U-20 World Cup.

FIFA U-20 World Cup

2007 FIFA U-20 World Cup

2011 FIFA U-20 World Cup

2013 FIFA U-20 World Cup

2015 FIFA U-20 World Cup

2017 FIFA U-20 World Cup

2019 FIFA U-20 World Cup

Results and fixtures
Results from previous 12 months and upcoming fixtures

Current squad

The following players were named in the preliminary squad for the 2023 PSSI U-20 Mini Tournament to be contested in February 2023.

Recent call-ups
The following players have previously been called up to the New Zealand under-20 squad in the last 12 months and remain eligible.

References

External links
New Zealand Under-20 Squad list and profiles
Junior All Whites Historical Results

under-20
Oceanian national under-20 association football teams